Tsun-ying Wong (1908 – 2 December 1960) was a Chinese academic and politician. She was among the first group of women elected to the Legislative Yuan in 1948.

Biography
Wong was born in 1908 and was originally from Panshidian in Shandong province. Her father Wong Yicheng was killed during the 1911 Revolution and she was adopted by the politician Ding Weifen. She earned a bachelor's degree at Yenching University, after which she went to the United States to study for a master's degree at the University of Michigan. While in America, she met and married Kuan-hai Ting and the couple had a son, Samuel. Two months after his birth, the couple returned to China, where they had two more children. She became a professor at the Sichuan Provincial Institute of Education and National Institute of Social Education. After joining the Kuomintang, she became an alternate member of the party's sixth central committee.

In the 1948 elections for the Legislative Yuan, Wong was a Kuomintang candidate in Shandong, and was elected to parliament. She relocated to Taiwan in 1948 during the Chinese Civil War, where she became an adjunct professor in the Department of Psychology at National Taiwan University and the Taiwan Provincial Institute of Education. In 1976 her son Samuel  won the Nobel Prize for physics. She remained a member of parliament until her death in New York City in December 1960.

References

1908 births
Yenching University alumni
University of Michigan alumni
Members of the Kuomintang
Members of the 1st Legislative Yuan
Members of the 1st Legislative Yuan in Taiwan
Academic staff of the National Taiwan University
1960 deaths
20th-century Chinese women politicians